Khaled Al-Dardour (born May 23, 1996) is a Jordanian football player who plays as a forward for Shabab Al-Ordon, Jordan and Jordan U-23.

International career statistics

References

External links 
 
 jo.gitsport.net
 eurosport.com

Jordanian footballers
Association football forwards
1996 births
Living people
Jordan international footballers
Jordan youth international footballers
Al-Ramtha SC players
Al-Baqa'a Club players
Sahab SC players
Shabab Al-Ordon Club players
Jordanian Pro League players